Trumpler is a lunar impact crater on the far side of the Moon, named after Swiss-American astronomer Robert Julius Trumpler (1886–1956). It lies just to the south of the crater Nušl, and northwest of Freundlich. To the southwest is the heavily battered crater Tikhomirov.

This is an old, eroded crater with an outer rim that has been damaged in places by subsequent impacts, especially along the southwestern section. The rim edge has been worn to the point where it is now poorly defined, and forms an uneven ridge in the surface. A short chain of small craterlets extends from near the crater midpoint to just outside the eastern rim. The southern interior floor is generally less impacted in the northern half.

Satellite craters 

By convention these features are identified on lunar maps by placing the letter on the side of the crater midpoint that is closest to Trumpler.

References 
 

 
 
 
 
 
 
 
 
 
 
 
 

Impact craters on the Moon